Vijay Merchant Trophy is an annual junior under 16 domestic cricket tournament of India. Board of Control for Cricket in India, the national governing body of sport of cricket in India, organise it. It is named after former legendry international cricketer Vijay Merchant, who played for Indian national cricket team for brief period of time.

In 2021 it was not organised, because the players were not vaccinated against COVID 19.

In 2019, Vijay Merchant Trophy was aired on Disney+ Hotstar app.

The junior teams of state association and regions plays in this tournament.

The tournament previously has been involved in issues related to age related violations by the some players.

2022-23 Vijay Merchant Trophy scheduled to play in Agartala, Guwahati of Tripura and Assam states respectively.

See also 
 Cricket in India 
 Sport in India, overview 9f sports in India

References 

Indian domestic cricket competitions
Cricket in India
Sport in India